The Khulna–Bagerhat Railway was a  narrow gauge railway in Bangladesh. It was constructed in 1918, and was dismantled in the 1980s.  long, in 1958 it had five 2-4-0t steam locomotives, 13 coaches, and 8 freight cars.

Stations 

Rupsa East
Karnapur
Samantasena
Bahirdia
Mulghar
Khanjahanpur
Jatrapur
Satgumbaz Road
Bagerhat College
Bagerhat

References 

2 ft 6 in gauge railways in Bangladesh
Khulna District